Blending may refer to:
 The process of mixing in process engineering
 Mixing paints to achieve a greater range of colors
 Blending (alcohol production), a technique to produce alcoholic beverages by mixing different brews
 Blending (linguistics), the process of forming a word from two or more letters that represent the sounds of a word
 Blending (music), a technique used in instrument playing
 Blending (vocal technique), a technique used in vocal warm up
 Blending curves, in mathematics
 Blending inheritance, a hypothetical model prior to the discovery of genetics
 Alpha blending, a transparency technique in computer image generation
 Conceptual blending, a general theory of cognition
 Gas blending, the filling of diving cylinders with non-air breathing gases such as nitrox, trimix and heliox
 Tea blending, the process of blending different teas to produce a final product
 The Blending (novel series), a fantasy series by Sharon Green
 Travel blending, a technique, developed in Australia, for encouraging people to make more efficient and environmentally sound transportation choices

See also 
 Blend (disambiguation)